"Disco Infiltrator" is a song from the eponymous debut album by LCD Soundsystem. It was released on 6 June 2005 as the debut's sixth single. The song was written by LCD Soundsystem's frontman James Murphy and produced by Murphy and Tim Goldsworthy as The DFA. It contains a sample from Kraftwerk's "Home Computer".

The B-side of the 7" release is a cover version of Siouxsie and the Banshees' "Slowdive" from their 1982 album, A Kiss in the Dreamhouse. The cover was recorded during a live in-studio performance for XFM London.

Track listing

References

LCD Soundsystem songs
2005 singles
Songs written by James Murphy (electronic musician)
2005 songs